Bilbao is a municipality and city in Spain.

Bilbao may also refer to:

Bilbao (surname), a surname
Bilbao (Mesoamerican site), an archaeological site in Guatemala
Bilbao (Madrid Metro), a Madrid Metro station in Spain